WDKF (99.7 FM) is a radio station licensed to Sturgeon Bay, Wisconsin, United States. The station serves the Green Bay area simulcasting co-owned WGEE with a classic country format as Duke FM.  The station is currently owned by Midwest Communications, with studios in Bellevue, and its main transmitter located near the town of Lincoln in Kewaunee County.

History
The station that would become WDKF launched in the early 1980s at 100.1 FM (eventually moving to 99.7 by 1986).  Compared to its simulcast partner in the Fox Valley, WDKF's format history has been mostly unstable.  The station started out in the early 80s under the WSBW call sign (not to be confused with the current WSBW in Sister Bay) and aired a locally originated adult contemporary format through studios in downtown Sturgeon Bay.  An ownership change in 1989 would see WSBW become WQZZ, with the station now using a satellite-fed AC format, the same service used by its sister station in the Fox Cities, the similarly-callsigned but separately-operated WOZZ.  In the fall of 1990, WQZZ became WHET-FM and adopted a new satellite-fed top 40 (CHR) format as "99.7 The Heat" to compete with Top 40 station WIXX; the station would go to an all-local Top 40 operation 2 years later.

By 1993, new FCC rules allowed companies to own a 2nd FM frequency in a market, and WHET's owners would sell the station to Midwest Communications that year.  Midwest planned to replace the "Heat" format to avoid direct competition with its heritage Top 40 station, WIXX, plans that were furthered along by severe storms that twice knocked WHET off the air in June and July 1993; the second storm permanently ended "The Heat," as Midwest used the outage to repair the signal and begin its transition to country.  By August 1993, the station became "99 Country," using the WGEE-FM call sign (mirroring that of its heritage country sister station, the current WTAQ) and using a 24/7 local operation in comparison to its mostly satellite-fed competitor, WJLW.

WGEE-FM remained as "99 Country" until September 1996, when FCC ownership rules were further loosened, allowing Midwest Communications to purchase WNCY-FM "Y100", which by then surpassed WJLW and WGEE-FM to become the dominant country station in the area.  Midwest would keep country on WNCY and change WGEE-FM to an adult contemporary station under the WLTM call sign. In 1998, Midwest would move WLTM to a simulcast with its similarly-formatted WROE (see above), a simulcast that would last until March 19, 2001, when WLTM adopted a more upbeat hot AC format as "Magic 99.7", with a schedule featuring Rick Dees' syndicated morning show.

On March 25, 2002, at 3 p.m., 99.7 switched formats again to a brand new (for Northeast Wisconsin) Rhythmic format as WLYD ("Wild 99-7"), while sister heritage Top 40 sister station WIXX gravitated to a rock-leaning top 40 format. The first song on "Wild" was "Rollout (My Business)" by Ludacris.  Although designed to be a flanker station for WIXX, "Wild 99-7" and its unique format for Green Bay would soon become one of the better-rated stations in the Green Bay market. "Wild 99-7" forced top 40 station WKSZ "95.9 Kiss FM" (WIXX's competition) to flip to Hot AC as "Mix 95.9" in April 2003.

On February 18, 2006, at Midnight, "Wild 99-7" would end as 'poor advertising sales' on the station forced Midwest to flip WLYD to a more advertiser-friendly adult hits format under the new call sign of WZBY ("99.7 The Bay").  One month later in March 2006, WKSZ reverted to "Kiss FM" and the Top 40 format, this time with a rhythmic lean to pick up on former "Wild 99-7" listeners.  WZBY would evolve to classic hits by September 2008, and in early 2009, began a simulcast on translator W270AJ (101.9 FM) to help with 99.7's signal issues in the immediate Green Bay area.  On September 15, 2009, WZBY and its "Bay" format would give way with a second simulcast with the Fox Valley's WROE, this time under the similar call sign of WRQE.

At 5 PM on September 3, 2010, Midwest Communications dropped the AC format a second time.  The stations became WYDR (94.3) and WZDR (99.7/101.9), and adopted a classic hits/classic rock hybrid format as "The Drive," a format similar to that of WDRV in Chicago and sister classic rock station WOZZ, which adopted a mainstream rock format at the same time and date as "The Drive's" debut (and using 99.7's former WRQE call sign).

On March 16, 2015, WZDR and translator W270AJ switched from a simulcast of WYDR 94.3 FM ("The Drive") to a simulcast of classic country-formatted WGEE-FM 93.5 FM, branded as "Duke FM" (under new calls, WDKF). W270AJ later switched to a translator for WNFL.

Previous logo

References

External links

DKF
Country radio stations in the United States
Radio stations established in 1982
Midwest Communications radio stations
1982 establishments in Wisconsin